Dillwynia laxiflora is a species of flowering plant in the family Fabaceae and is endemic to Western Australia. It is a prostrate to spreading shrub with needle-shaped leaves and yellow and red flowers.

Description
Dillwynia laxiflora is a prostrate to spreading or scrambling shrub with mostly glabrous branches. Flowering occurs in October and the fruit is a follicle that is not constricted between the seeds.

Taxonomy
Dillwynia laxiflora was first described in 1837 by George Bentham in Charles von Hügel's Botanisches Archiv der Gartenbaugesellschaft der Ossterreichischen Kaiserstaates. The specific epithet (laxiflora) means "wide or open-flowered".

Distribution and habitat
This dillwynia grows in sandy or gravelly soils on hillcrests in the south-west of Western Australia.

References 

laxiflora
Fabales of Australia
Rosids of Western Australia
Plants described in 1837
Taxa named by George Bentham